Solo 7: Napoli is a solo piano album by Franco D'Andrea. It was recorded in 2001 and released by Philology Records.

Recording and music
Material for this and seven other solo piano CDs was recorded over the period of three mornings and two afternoons in April 2001. The compositions are associated with Naples.

Release and reception

Solo 7 was released by Philology Records. The AllMusic reviewer wrote: "Because it's hard to judge improvisations when one hasn't heard the original works, this release ranks just a notch below the other seven volumes".

Track listing
"Voce 'E Notte"
"Munasterio 'E Santa Chiara"
"Funiculì, Funiculà"
"O' Sole Mio"
"Reginella"
"Anema E Core"
"Resta Cu'mme"

Personnel
Franco D'Andrea – piano

References

Franco D'Andrea albums
Solo piano jazz albums